The following radio stations broadcast on FM frequency 97.7 MHz:

Argentina
 Radio Maria in 30 de agosto, Buenos Aires
 Radio Maria in Termas de Río Hondo, Santiago del Estero

Australia
 3SER in Melbourne, Victoria
 ABC Classic FM in Perth, Western Australia
 ABC Classic FM in Roma, Queensland
 3GVR in Shepparton, Victoria
 Rhema FM in Darwin, Northern Territory
 SBS Radio in Sydney, New South Wales
 2SKI in Cooma, New South Wales
 The Breeze in Gloucester, New South Wales
 Triple J in Gold Coast, Queensland
 TOTE Sport Radio in Burnie, Tasmania

Canada (Channel 249)
 CBF-4 in Matagami, Quebec (new coming soon)
 CBKF-FM in Regina, Saskatchewan
 CBTN-FM in Fernie, British Columbia
 CBUF-FM in Vancouver, British Columbia
 CFAZ-FM in Gander, Newfoundland and Labrabor
 CFBI-FM in Cambridge Bay, Nunavut
 CFCV-FM in St. Andrew's, Newfoundland and Labrador
 CFGP-FM in Grande Prairie, Alberta
 CFTH-FM-1 in Harrington Harbour, Quebec
 CHDH-FM in Siksika, Alberta
 CHGB-FM in Wasaga Beach, Ontario
 CHMS-FM in Bancroft, Ontario
 CHOM-FM in Montreal, Quebec
 CHTZ-FM in St. Catharines, Ontario
 CHUP-FM in Calgary, Alberta
 CIDD-FM in Carlyle Lake Resort, Saskatchewan
 CIDO-FM in Creston, British Columbia
 CILE-FM-1 in Lac Allard, Quebec
 CILE-FM-2 in Riviere-au-Tonnerre, Quebec
 CKEN-FM in Kentville, Nova Scotia
 CKTK-FM in Kitimat, British Columbia
 VF2367 in Dillon, Saskatchewan
 VF2433 in Iqaluit, Nunavut

China 
 CNR The Voice of China in Qiqihar, Yantai and Zhangzhou

Malaysia
 Terengganu FM in Southern Terengganu
 Zayan in Kuching, Sarawak(?)

Mexico
 XEEW-FM in Matamoros, Tamaulipas
 XERC-FM in Mexico City
 XHAAL-FM in Saltillo, Coahuila
 XHAL-FM in Manzanillo, Colima
 XHARE-FM in Meoqui, Chihuahua

 XHESCC-FM in Sabinas, Coahuila
 XHESH-FM in Sabinas Hidalgo, Nuevo León
 XHGL-FM in Mérida, Yucatán
 XHGRC-FM in Acapulco, Guerrero
 XHGTC-FM in Tuxtla Gutiérrez, Chiapas
 XHHO-FM in Ciudad Obregón, Sonora
 XHLOS-FM in Montemorelos, Nuevo León
 XHNF-FM in Tepic, Nayarit
 XHOT-FM in Xalapa, Veracruz
 XHRPO-FM in Santa Cruz Amilpas, Oaxaca
 XHRW-FM in Tampico, Tamaulipas
 XHSEA-FM in Cananea, Sonora
 XHSNP-FM in San Luis Potosí, San Luis Potosí
 XHWO-FM in Chetumal, Quintana Roo
 XHWT-FM in Culiacán, Sinaloa
 XHZU-FM in Zacapu, Michoacán

United States (Channel 249)
  in The Dalles, Oregon
 KALK in Winfield, Texas
  in Marksville, Louisiana
 KATX in Eastland, Texas
  in Nebraska City, Nebraska
 KCCH-LP in Helena, Montana
 KCNN in Benson, Arizona
  in Grundy Center, Iowa
 KCYA in Rolling Hills, Wyoming
 KCYI-LP in Oklahoma City, Oklahoma
 KCYP-LP in Mission, Texas
  in Elsinore, Utah
 KDLC in Dulac, Louisiana
 KEQB in Coburg, Oregon
 KFGB-LP in Topeka, Kansas
 KGFZ in Burke, Texas
  in Anaconda, Montana
  in Humboldt, Iowa
 KHHZ in Gridley, California
 KHIA-LP in Brundage, Texas
  in Mangum, Oklahoma
 KHRK in Hennessey, Oklahoma
  in Healdton, Oklahoma
 KJMR-LP in Chattaroy, Washington
  in Los Altos, California
 KJSM-FM in Augusta, Arkansas
 KKDS-LP in Eureka, California
 KLGR-FM in Redwood Falls, Minnesota
 KLVO (FM) in Belen, New Mexico
  in Gibbon, Nebraska
  in Dubach, Louisiana
  in Redfield, South Dakota
 KNIU-LP in Kansas City, Kansas
 KNOZ in Orchard Mesa, Colorado
 KNWN-FM in Oakville, Washington
 KNZR-FM in Shafter, California
 KOGI-LP in Big Pine, California
 KORJ in Butte Falls, Oregon
  in Ottumwa, Iowa
 KPFF-LP in Pahrump, Nevada
 KPLS-FM in Strasburg, Colorado
  in La Monte, Missouri
 KQBS in Potosi, Missouri
 KQLW-LP in Lewistown, Montana
  in Shell Knob, Missouri
 KQQO-LP in Ogallala, Nebraska
  in Calexico, California
  in Mecca, California
 KRGU-LP in Midwest City, Oklahoma
  in Roma, Texas
 KRWL-LP in Coquille, Oregon
 KRXD in McNary, Arizona
 KSNP (FM) in Burlington, Kansas
 KTAQ-LP in Sandpoint, Idaho
  in Mojave, California
  in Monte Rio, California
 KWAP-LP in Florissant, Missouri
  in Lodi, California
 KWNK-LP in Reno, Nevada
 KXJN in Moose Wilson Road, Wyoming
 KYRT in Mason, Texas
  in East Wenatchee, Washington
 KZAR in McQueeney, Texas
  in Lapwai, Idaho
 KZYR in Avon, Colorado
 WAFL (FM) in Milford, Delaware
  in Barron, Wisconsin
  in Marathon, Florida
 WAZK in Nantucket, Massachusetts
 WBCR-LP in Great Barrington, Massachusetts
 WCIG in Big Flats, New York
  in Jackson, Ohio
  in Spencer, Indiana
  in Norwich, Connecticut
  in Caribou, Maine
  in Hyde Park, New York
  in Amsterdam, New York
 WFBO-LP in Flagler Beach, Florida
  in Lomira, Wisconsin
  in Castalia, Ohio
  in Lancaster, Wisconsin
  in Lyndon, Vermont
 WGPB in Rome, Georgia
  in Winfall, North Carolina
 WHET in West Frankfort, Illinois
 WHZK-LP in Greenwood, South Carolina
 WILE-FM in Byesville, Ohio
 WJEV-LP in Dale City, Virginia
  in Salt Lick, Kentucky
  in Auburn, Alabama
 WKSH-LP in Shreveport, Louisiana
  in Winfield, Alabama
  in Butler, Pennsylvania
  in Somerset, Pennsylvania
  in Rensselaer, Indiana
 WMCW-LP in Astor, Florida
 WMDM in Lexington Park, Maryland
  in Eatonton, Georgia
  in Manistee, Michigan
  in Monmouth, Illinois
  in Beaverton, Michigan
 WNLB-LP in Holland, Ohio
  in Winter Harbor, Maine
 WNVM in Cidra, Puerto Rico
 WOLV in Houghton, Michigan
 WOXY (FM) in Oxford, Ohio
 WQDC in Sturgeon Bay, Wisconsin
 WQLZ in Petersburg, Illinois
 WRBJ-FM in Brandon, Mississippi
 WREF in Sebree, Kentucky
 WRIC-FM in Richlands, Virginia
 WRYD in Jemison, Alabama
 WSNI in Swanzey, New Hampshire
 WSTQ (FM) in Streator, Illinois
 WTCQ in Vidalia, Georgia
 WTGN in Lima, Ohio
 WTGO-LP in Lafayette, Indiana
 WTGV-FM in Sandusky, Michigan
 WTLQ-FM in Punta Rassa, Florida
 WTTY in Ty Ty, Georgia
 WTYJ in Fayette, Mississippi
 WTYL-FM in Tylertown, Mississippi
 WVBB in Elliston-Lafayette, Virginia
 WVCU-LP in Athens, West Virginia
 WVRT in Mill Hall, Pennsylvania
 WWOC-LP in Bowling Green, Ohio
 WWPP-LP in Homestead, Florida
 WWSH-LP in Vero Beach, Florida
 WWUF in Waycross, Georgia
 WWXM in Garden City, South Carolina
 WYJJ in Trenton, Tennessee
 WYXX in Goshen, Indiana
 WYYX in Bonifay, Florida
 WZKT in Walnut Creek, North Carolina
 WZRM in Brockton, Massachusetts
 WZZN in Union Grove, Alabama

Lists of radio stations by frequency